The 2004 Sultan of Selangor Cup was played on 16 May 2004, at Singapore National Stadium in Kallang, Singapore.

Match 
Source:

Players 

Source:

Veterans 
A match between veterans of two teams are also held in the same day before the real match starts as a curtain raiser.

References 

2004 in Malaysian football
Selangor FA
Sultan of Selangor Cup